Marcello Maruzzo (23 July 1929 – 1 July 1981), known in his religious order as Tullio, and his friend, Luis Navarro (21 June 1950 – 1 July 1981), were Italian and Guatemalan missionaries, respectively, dedicated to catechesis and evangelization among the local people in Guatemala. Maruzzo was a professed priest from the Order of Friars Minor and Navarro was part of the Secular Franciscan Order.

Their beatification received approval from Pope Francis and it was celebrated in Izabal, Guatemala on 27 October 2018.

Life

Maruzzo
Marcello Maruzzo was born in Vicenza, Italy in 1929 to the poor peasants Angelo Maruzzo and Augusta Rappo, one of eight children. His twin sibling was Daniele (later Fra Lucio). His mother died on 21 September 1940.

Maruzzo and his twin brother Daniele joined the Order of Friars Minor in 1940 (first doing their novitiate) and both received their ordination to the priesthood from Cardinal Angelo Giuseppe Roncalli—the future Pope John XXIII—on 21 June 1953. Maruzzo studied for the priesthood in Chiampo before his first vesting in the habit in 1945 and his profession in 1951. His brother left Italy to be a missionary in Central America in December 1956. Maruzzo followed his brother leaving Italy for Guatemala in 1960. He first settled in Puerto Barrios on 16 December 1960, learning Spanish so he could communicate with the local communities. He tended to their needs and celebrated Mass for them but also moved from village to village where he worked with the local Caritas distributing necessities to the poor while defending the rights of the peasants. He evangelized the message of the Gospel to them and was known for being a friend to the poor and the homeless.

Maruzzo received warnings, threats, and intimidation aimed at stopping his work. He was accused of being a "communist priest". His superiors feared that the intimidation would escalate, so they transferred Maruzzo elsewhere, but the threats continued. It was during his final placement that he met and worked alongside Luis Navarro, who was a catechist.

He and Navarro were at a catechetical meeting when the pair were ambushed and shot dead at 10:40 pm on 1 July 1981.

Navarro
Luis Obdulio Arroyo Navarro was born on 21 June 1950, and served as a catechist in Guatemala, his birthplace. After meeting Marcello Maruzzo, the two collaborated in evangelizing and catechizing to the poor and peasants in the Izabal Department. He became a member of the Secular Franciscan Order and remained unmarried throughout his life.

He and Maruzzo were attending a catechetical meeting one evening when the pair was ambushed and shot dead. Navarro knew of the threats directed against Maruzzo, but worked with him despite knowing that he, too, could be targeted.

Beatification
The beatification process commenced under Pope Benedict XVI, on 10 November 2005. Subsequently, the Congregation for the Causes of Saints (C.C.S.) declared the "nihil obstat" (no objections to the cause) and the two men were given the title Servants of God. The investigation was conducted by the Izabal apostolic vicars under Gabriel Peñate Rodríguez bishop from its inauguration on 31 January 2006 until its closure later on 15 July 2008. Their documents of investigation went to the C.C.S. in Rome who validated the diocesan phase of investigation in a decree issued on 12 February 2010. The C.C.S. received the Positio dossier from the postulation later in 2014.

The theologians advising the congregation issued their approval to the argument that the two were killed in hatred of the faith in their meeting held on 31 May 2016, while the members of the C.C.S. also confirmed this on 26 September 2017. Pope Francis confirmed their beatification in a decree promulgated on 9 October 2017 in an audience with the congregation's prefect.

The beatification was held in Izabal, Guatemala on 27 October 2018.

The current postulator for this cause is the Franciscan priest Giovangiuseppe Califano.

References

External links
 Hagiography Circle

20th-century venerated Christians
Beatifications by Pope Francis
Deaths by firearm in Guatemala
People murdered in Guatemala
Roman Catholic missionaries in Guatemala
Venerated Catholics